James Wise may refer to:

 James Wise (civil surgeon) (died 1886), British civil surgeon in Dhaka, British India
 James E. Wise Jr., U.S. Navy officer
 James H. Wise (died 1939), bishop of Kansas in the Episcopal Church
 James H. Wise (politician) (1912–1976), American politician
 James W. Wise (1868–1925), U.S. Representative from Georgia

See also
 Jim Wise (born 1964), American actor
 Jim Wise (composer) (1919–2000), American musical composer and English professor
 Thomas James Wise (1859–1937), British bibliophile